Jervoise Smith (3 October 1828 – 21 July 1884) was a British Liberal Party  politician and banker.

Smith was the son of former Chichester MP John Abel Smith and Anne née Clarke-Jervoise. He married Margaret Louisa Verney, daughter of Robert Verney in 1874, and they had issue.

He was a partner in the banking firm Smith, Payne, and Smiths, the first British bank believed to be formed outside London but later gaining a home on Lombard Street. In 1881, he worked at the bank with Samuel George Smith, Robert Smith, Oswald Augustus Smith, Eric Carrington Smith, and Martin Ridley Smith.

Smith was elected a Liberal MP for Penryn and Falmouth at a by-election in 1866 but lost the seat at the next general election in 1868.

References

External links
 

Liberal Party (UK) MPs for English constituencies
UK MPs 1865–1868
1828 births
1884 deaths
Members of the Parliament of the United Kingdom for Penryn and Falmouth